Bučje is a village in the municipalities of Novo Goražde, Republika Srpska and Goražde, Bosnia and Herzegovina.

Demographics 
According to the 2013 census, its population was 23, all of the living in the Novo Goražde part, thus none in the Goražde part.

References

Populated places in Novo Goražde
Populated places in Goražde